Brett Meredith (born 20 January 1989) is an Australian rules footballer. He played for the Sydney Swans in the Australian Football League (AFL) for five seasons.

In 2009, Meredith made his debut for the Swans and looked to be quite a skilful and impressive young midfielder. Injuries brought his season to an early close however. In 2010, Meredith showed improvement in his game playing across the half forward flank when playing in the seniors.

He was delisted by the Swans at the end of the 2012 season.

In 2013 Meredith signed to play with the Werribee Tigers in the Victorian Football League (VFL) along with former Sydney player Jarred Moore.
Werribee lost to the Box Hill Hawks in the 2013 VFL Preliminary final with Brett been named in the best players in the final.

References

External links

1989 births
Sydney Swans players
Living people
Australian rules footballers from Victoria (Australia)
Northern Knights players
Werribee Football Club players